The common iliac artery is a large artery of the abdomen paired on each side. It originates from the aortic bifurcation at the level of the 4th lumbar vertebra. It ends in front of the sacroiliac joint, one on either side, and each bifurcates into the external and internal iliac arteries.

Structure 
The common iliac artery are about 4 cm long in adults and more than a centimeter in diameter. It begins as a branch of the aorta. This is at the level of the 4th lumbar vertebra. It runs inferolaterally, along the medial border of the psoas muscles. It bifurcates into the external iliac artery and the internal iliac artery at the pelvic brim, in front of the sacroiliac joints.

The common iliac artery, and all of its branches, exist as paired structures (that is to say, there is one on the left side and one on the right).

The distribution of the common iliac artery is basically the pelvis and lower limb (as the femoral artery) on the corresponding side.

Relations 
Both common iliac arteries are accompanied along their course by the two common iliac veins, which lie posteriorly and to the right. Their terminal bifurcation is crossed anteriorly by the ureters. This is significant, as the bifurcation of the common iliac artery is the second point of ureteric constriction.

Function 
The common iliac artery supplies the leg and the pelvic region.

Clinical significance

Constriction 
The common iliac artery may become narrowed. This is most common at the aortic bifurcation.

Dilatation 
Dilatation of the common iliac artery can be graded into the following categories:

Additional images

References

External links 
Hypogastric artery - thefreedictionary.com
  - "The Abdominal Aorta"
  - "Posterior Abdominal Wall: The Abdominal Aorta and Paraaortic Nerve Plexus"
 

Arteries of the abdomen